Moukaila Goga (born 4 May 1987 in Lomé) is a Togolese footballer who currently plays for CS Louhans-Cuiseaux in the France Championnat de France amateur.

Career
Goga began his career with Planète Foot and joined 2006 to French based club CS Louhans-Cuiseaux.

International career
He earned on 23 May 2010 his first call-up for the Togo national football team and made his debut in the Corsica Cup against Gabon national football team.

References

1987 births
Living people
Togolese footballers
Togo international footballers
French footballers
Association football forwards
Expatriate footballers in France
Louhans-Cuiseaux FC players
Togolese expatriate sportspeople in France
21st-century Togolese people